Pectinimura lutescens is a moth in the family Lecithoceridae. It is found in Papua New Guinea.

The length of the forewings is about 10.5 mm. The forewing colour pattern is similar to that of Pectinimura baryoma, but this species can be distinguished by the larger size and the conspicuous discal stigmata on the forewings.

References

Moths described in 1954
lutescens